Eobaatar is a genus of extinct mammal from the Lower Cretaceous of Mongolia, Spain and England. A member of the also extinct order Multituberculata, it lies within the suborder Plagiaulacida and family Eobaataridae. The genus Eobaatar was named by Kielan-Jaworowska Z., Dashzeveg D. and Trofimov B.A. in 1987. Its name was made from Greek "eos" = "dawn" and Mongolian "baatar" = "hero"", "warrior".

Species

Eobaatar hispanicus
This species was named by Hahn G. and Hahn R. in 1992. Remains consisting of a single tooth were found in Hauterivian - Barremian (Lower Cretaceous)-age strata of the Camarillas Formation, Spain.

Eobaatar magnus
This species was named by Kielan-Jaworowska Z., Dashzeveg D. and Trofimov B.A. in 1987. It is based on a fragment of lower jaw with teeth found in Aptian or Albian (Lower Cretaceous) strata of the Dzunbain Formation in Guchin Us County, Mongolia, and had a cranial length of about 3 cm.

Eobaatar minor
This species was also named by Kielan-Jaworowska Z., Dashzeveg D. and Trofimov B.A. in 1987. Remains were found in Lower Cretaceous Dzunbain Formation of Mongolia. Going by the species name, it was probably relatively small; his skull was 2 cm in length indeed.

Eobaatar pajaronensis
This species was named by Hahn G. and Hahn R. in 2001. Remains were discovered in Barremian (Lower Cretaceous) strata of the Camarillas Formation in Spain.

Eobaatar clemensi
This species was named by Steven Sweetman in 2009. Remains were found in the Barremian (lower Cretaceous) of the Wessex formation, England.

Sources
 Zofia Kielan-Jaworowska, Richard L. Cifelli, and Zhe-Xi Luo (2004). "Mammals from the age of dinosaurs : origins, evolution, and structure" pp. 260–342. 
 Hahn & Hahn (2001), "Multituberculaten-zähne aus der Unter-Kreide (Barremium) von Ple Pajaron (Prov. Cuenca, Spanien)". Paläontologische Zeitschrift 74 (4), p. 587-589.
 Kielan-Jaworowska et al. (1987), "Early Cretaceous multituberculates from Mongolia and a comparison with Late Jurassic form". Acta Palaeontologica Polonica 32, p. 3-47.
 Kielan-Jaworowska Z & Hurum JH (2001), "Phylogeny and Systematics of multituberculate mammals". Paleontology 44, p. 389-429.
 Much of this information has been derived from MESOZOIC MAMMALS: Plagiaulacidae, Albionbaataridae, Eobaataridae & Arginbaataridae
 S. C. Sweetman. 2009. A new species of the plagiaulacoid multituberculate mammal Eobaatar from the Early Cretaceous of southern Britain. Acta Palaeontologica Polonica 54(3):373-384

Multituberculates
Early Cretaceous mammals of Europe
Early Cretaceous mammals of Asia
Barremian genus first appearances
Aptian genus extinctions
Cretaceous Spain
Cretaceous Mongolia
Cretaceous England
Fossils of Spain
Fossils of Mongolia
Fossils of England
Camarillas Formation
La Huérguina Formation
Prehistoric mammal genera